The Obie Awards or Off-Broadway Theater Awards are annual awards originally given by The Village Voice newspaper to theatre artists and groups in New York City. In September 2014, the awards were jointly presented and administered with the American Theatre Wing. As the Tony Awards cover Broadway productions, the Obie Awards cover off-Broadway and off-off-Broadway productions. It has often been considered off-Broadway's highest honor.

Background

The Obie Awards were initiated by Edwin (Ed) Fancher, publisher of The Village Voice, who handled the financing and business side of the project. They were first given in 1956 under the direction of theater critic Jerry Tallmer. Initially, only off-Broadway productions were eligible; in 1964, off-off-Broadway productions were made eligible. The first Obie Awards ceremony was held at Helen Gee's cafe.

With the exception of the Lifetime Achievement and Best New American Play awards, there are no fixed categories at the Obie Awards, and the winning actors and actresses are all in a single category titled "Performance." There are no announced nominations. Awards in the past have included performance, direction, best production, design, special citations, and sustained achievement. Not every category is awarded every year.  The Village Voice also awards annual Obie grants to selected companies; in 2011, these grants were $2,000 each to Metropolitan Playhouse and Wakka Wakka Productions. There is also a Ross Wetzsteon Grant, named after its former theater editor, in the amount of $2,000 (in 2009; in 2011 the grant was $1,000), for a theatre that nurtures innovative new plays.

The first awards in 1955-1956 for plays and musicals were given to Absalom (Lionel Abel) as Best New Play, Uncle Vanya, Best All-Around Production and The Threepenny Opera as Best Musical.

Other awards for off-Broadway theatre are the Lucille Lortel Awards, the Drama Desk Awards, the Drama League Award, and the Outer Critics Circle Awards.

As of September 2014, the Obie Awards are jointly presented by the American Theatre Wing and the Village Voice, with the Wing having "overall responsibility for running" the Awards.

Award categories
Obie Award for Distinguished Performance by an Actress
 Obie Award for Distinguished Performance by an Actor
 Obie Award for Distinguished Performance by an Ensemble
 Sustained Achievement Award
 Best New American Theatre Work Award
 Playwriting Award
 Design Award
 Special Citations
 Obie Grants
 The Ross Wetzsteon Award

Ceremony history
Obie Award ceremonies have been held at Webster Hall in Manhattan's East Village since the 2010-2011 season.

Notable winners 
 Winners from Infoplease.com
 "OBIE winners, 2011–2012", playbill.com
 "OBIE winners, 2012–2013", playbill.com
 "OBIE winners, 2013–2014", playbill.com
 "OBIE winners, 2014–2015", playbill.com
 "OBIE winners, 2015–2016", playbill.com
 OBIE winners, 2017
 OBIE winners, 2018
OBIE winners, 2019
OBIE winners, 2020

2010s

2000s

Grants 
Obie Grants are awarded each year to select theatre companies. Previous recipients include:

Ross Wetzsteon Award is a $2,000 grant awarded to a theatre that nurture innovative new plays. Previous recipients include:

References

External links

 

American theater awards
Awards established in 1956
1956 establishments in New York City